Greg McLean  is a Canadian politician who was elected to represent the riding of Calgary Centre in the House of Commons of Canada in the 2019 Canadian federal election.

He defeated former cabinet minister Kent Hehr by 20,000 votes.

Personal life

Before his election, McLean was a financial professional for 20 years, working with oil & gas and technology start-ups amongst other industries. He was a Chartered Investment Manager, registered as a Portfolio Manager with the Alberta Securities Commission  and served as a director of a public oil and gas company and director of a private oil and gas services technology company. Early in his career, he spent six years advising two Cabinet Ministers in Ottawa, Hon. Harvie Andre and Hon. Jean Corbeil, providing insight into government and regulatory decision-making.

McLean has a Bachelor of Commerce Degree from the University of Alberta, and an MBA from the Richard Ivey School of Business at the University of Western Ontario.

He and his wife Ruth Pogue have four adult sons.

Political career
In the  2019 Canadian federal election, McLean was elected represent Calgary Centre in the House of Commons of the 43rd Canadian Parliament. He introduced two private member bills. Bill C-262, An Act to amend the Income Tax Act (capture and utilization or storage of greenhouse gases) sought create a tax credit for expenses incurred by a corporation capturing and storing of the greenhouse gases carbon monoxide and carbon dioxide. It was brought to a vote on June 9, 2021, but defeated with only Conservative Party members voting in favour. McLean also introduced Bill C-214 An Act to amend the Income Tax Act (qualifying environmental trust) on February 24, 2020, which sought to add oil or gas wells to the list of sites that environmental trusts may hold for the purposes of the Qualifying Environmental Trust income tax rate, but the bill was discharged without a vote. In the 2020 Conservative Party of Canada leadership election he endorsed Erin O'Toole.

On September 8, 2020, new Conservative Leader Erin O'Toole named McLean the Shadow Minister for Natural Resources and for the Canadian Northern Economic Development Agency (CanNor). He was previously the Conservative Party's Deputy Shadow Critic for National Revenue under Leader Andrew Scheer between his election in October 2019 and his new appointment in September 2020. McLean was also named to the Standing Committee on Natural Resources in September 2020. He was previously a member of the House of Commons Standing Committee on Justice and Human Rights. After the 2021 election, McLean served briefly on the Finance Committee (December 2021 to February 2022) before returning to the post of Shadow Minister for Natural Resources and the Natural Resources Standing Committee in late February 2022.

His questions and speeches in the House of Commons have focused primarily on issues related to natural resources, mainly oil and gas, and to issues of finance and government spending, deficit and debt. During the COVID-19 pandemic, he spoke about the efficacy of government programs and expenditures, and in particular, about the Canada Student Service Grant and its sole-source contract to the WE charity (since terminated). He participated in a Calgary news conference with other MPs calling for the "Not Criminally Responsible" designation to be reviewed (an issue related to Calgary's "Brentwood Five" massacre); and has spoken out in support of democracy in Hong Kong.

Electoral record

References

External links 

 Official Website
 GregMcLean on Twitter
 Greg McLean on Facebook

Living people
Conservative Party of Canada MPs
Members of the House of Commons of Canada from Alberta
Politicians from Calgary
Year of birth missing (living people)